The Oxford and County Secretarial College (the "Ox and Cow") was a prestigious secretarial school for young women centrally located in the university City of Oxford. Founded in 1936 by the Hall family (Ernest and Irene Hall), it moved to its well-known central location at 34 St. Giles in 1952, where it was based until 1999. The College, run in the latter years by Peter Hall, accepted UK and international students with a minimum of 5 good GCE 'O' levels and most lived in college-owned shared houses in North Oxford.  Courses were typically for twelve months resulting in a Diploma. The college had strong links with top office recruitment agencies in London.

One notable alumna was the flamboyant fashion designer Isabella Blow.

The College was later known as The Oxford and County Business College, expanded its course offerings and became co-educational.  It merged into the Oxford Media & Business School in 1999.

References

Defunct universities and colleges in England
Education in Oxford